Soft Money is the second studio album by American hip hop artist Jel. It was released on Anticon on February 20, 2006. "WMD / All Around" was released as a single from the album.

Critical reception
At Metacritic, which assigns a weighted average score out of 100 to reviews from mainstream critics, Soft Money received an average score of 67% based on 14 reviews, indicating "generally favorable reviews."

Brian Howe of Pitchfork gave the album a 6.0 out of 10, describing it as "a murky palimpsest of disembodied samples and dirty beats, incantatory rhymes and live instrumentation, leftist rhetoric and absurdist non sequiturs, breathy female vocals and ephemeral melodies". Martin Longley of BBC said: "There are few dynamic surprises here, and no serrated edges, but this disc's strength lies in its building mass of lumbering, decelerated funk, its textures gluey and thick." Luciana Lopez of XLR8R said: "The album slices and dices genres throughout, and the music sounds all the better for it." Bram Gieben of The Skinny gave the album 4 stars out of 5, calling it "one of the most rewarding Anticon releases so far."

Track listing

Personnel
Credits adapted from liner notes.

 Jel – writing, production, performance, recording, arrangement
 Odd Nosdam – additional recording, mixing, editing, song arrangement, sounds, filter play, drone (8)
 Yoni Wolf – piano (2), synthesizer (2)
 Josiah Wolf – bass guitar (2)
 Andrew Broder – guitar (3)
 Dosh – Rhodes piano (3), sampler (3)
 Alexander Kort – cello (3)
 Stefanie Böhm – words (4), vocals (4, 7), guitar (4)
 Harvey Salters – synthesizer (4), keyboards (8)
 Pedestrian – words (7)
 Wise Intelligent – words (9), vocals (9)
 Adam Drucker – cover art design, sculpture, photography
 Erin Perry – cover art design, sculpture, photography
 Wes Winship – font, layout

References

External links
 

2006 albums
Jel (music producer) albums
Anticon albums